Eznav or Aznav may refer to:
 Eznav, Famenin
 Eznav, Malayer